Ramón López de Osornio (1685 – 1757) was a Spanish landowner and military man who served as commander of provincial militias during the colonial period of Argentina. He owned farms in the towns of La Matanza and Magdalena, where he dedicated himself to raising cattle. 

He was born in Buenos Aires, the son of Francisco López Osornio and Tomasa Merlo, belonging to an illustrious family of landowners. He was married to Margarita Sosa, belonging to old Creole families of Portuguese roots. His son Juan Basilio López de Osornio was married to Petrona Josefa González de Melo, a distinguished Creole lady, belonging to the families of Melo-Coutinho and Gómez de Saravia-Dominguez de Palermo.

He was the uncle of Clemente López de Osornio, a known military man and landowner killed during an indigenous raid on his ranch, and relative to Casimiro Alegre. a distinguished commander of militias in the towns of Magdalena and San Vicente.

References

External links 
Bibiana Andreucci, "Familia, redes y poder en la Guardia de Luján", Mundo Agrario, vol. 11, nº 21, segundo semestre de 2010. ISSN 1515-5994. Universidad Nacional de La Plata. 

1685 births
1756 deaths
People from Buenos Aires
People from Buenos Aires Province
Argentine people of Spanish descent
Spanish colonial governors and administrators